= Dead Orchards =

British band

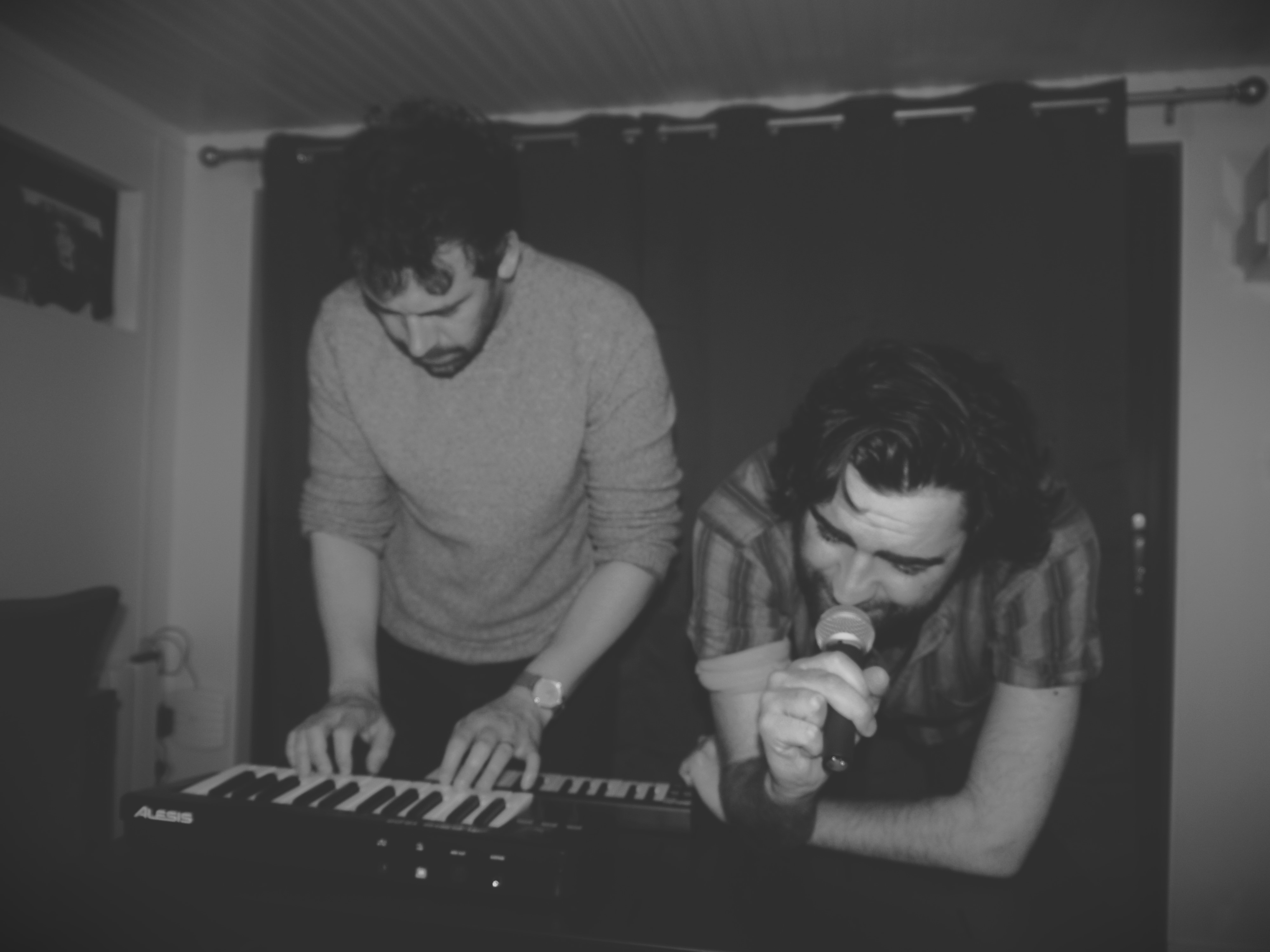
- Dead Orchards 2023

Background information
- Origin: London, England
- Genres: Indie rock, dark wave, alternative rock, dream pop
- Years active: 2016-present
- Members: Simon Adams; Bobby Faghihi

Dead Orchards are an English indie rock band formed in London, England in 2016. The band consists of multi-instrumentalist Simon Adams and vocalist-guitarist Bobby Faghihi who met as students. To date, the band have released 4 full albums and 3 EPs. Dead Orchards write, record and produce everything independently and have developed a sound that sits comfortably between alternative, electronica, darkwave and dream pop.

== History ==
After originally starting as a lo-fi acoustic outfit in 2016, the band changed direction in the early 2020s, moving towards a more electronic, synth-driven sound, with their 2024 album "No Longer Will We Dream" drawing on a wide range of influences and instruments. On reviewing their 2024 album, RGM described the record as "a refreshing mix of acoustic roots and electronic ambition that makes it feel like Dead Orchards are paving a unique path forward." Rats on the Run said the album contains "the very purest form of post punk". Their 2026 release "This Was Always Yours" has been described as murky and emotional, but with different styles from track to track, mixing dreamy sounds with stronger electronic moments.

Dead Orchards have played a number of London venues such as The Water Rats, Hope and Anchor, Half Moon and 229.

== Discography ==
=== Albums ===
- Sins In Lo-fi (2020)
- I Sometimes Wonder Where You Are Now (2023)
- No Longer Will We Dream (2024)
- This Was Always Yours (2026)

=== Extended Plays ===
- Postpone Everything From Now On (2021)
- Months Tied Unremembering (2022)
- Try (2023)
